Big Metal Birds is the debut album by American noise rock band Janitor Joe. It was released in 1993, on Amphetamine Reptile Records, and was the band's only album to feature bassist Kristen Pfaff, who would leave the band to join Hole later that year, before her death in 1994.

Critical reception
Trouser Press praised "the blue-collar manner in which [the band] rakes through grit-mottled riffs, fashioning a burnished, no-frills end product likely to pique the curiosity of those prone to solicit ear perforation." The Washington Post called the songs "short and punchy, less grinding (though no gentler) than typical AmRep fare," writing that "though not quite sprightly, songs like 'Slur' and the neo-rockabilly 'Goal Oriented' do have a spring in their grunge." Option called the album "classic Amphetamine Reptile ... full of hair-raising guitar grunts, guttural vocals, tree trunk-pounded drums — all slathered with a thick coating of grimy production ethos the color of Guinness Stout."

Track listing

Personnel
Joachim Breuer – vocals, guitar
Kristen Pfaff – bass guitar, vocals
Matt Entsminger – drums

References

1993 debut albums